Ferruccio is an Italian given name derived from the Latin Ferrutio (the name of a 3rd-century Christian saint). It is also used as a surname. People with the name include:

Given name

A–L
Ferruccio Amendola (1930–2001), Italian actor 
Ferruccio Azzarini (1924–2005), Italian football player
Ferruccio Bianchi, Italian racing driver
Ferruccio Biancini (1890–1955), Italian actor
Ferruccio Bortoluzzi (1920–2007), Italian modern painter
Ferruccio Bruni (1899–1971), Italian athlete
Ferruccio Busoni (1866–1924), Italian composer, pianist, music teacher and conductor
Ferruccio Cerio (1904–1963), Italian film writer and director
Ferruccio Diena, Italian football player
Ferruccio Fazio (born 1944), Italian politician
Ferruccio Ferrazzi (1891–1978), Italian painter and sculptor 
Ferruccio Furlanetto (born 1949), Italian bass-baritone
Ferruccio Ghinaglia (1899–1921), founder and director of the Pavian Federation of the Italian Communist Party
Ferruccio Ghidini (1912–?), Italian football player.
Ferruccio Lamborghini (1916–1993), Italian car maker
Ferruccio Lamborghini (motorcyclist) (born 1991), Italian motorcycle racer
Ferruccio Lantini (1886–1958), Italian politician

M–Z
Ferruccio Manza (born 1943), Italian cyclist
Ferruccio Mataresi (1928–2009), Italian artist
Ferruccio Mazzola (1945–2013), Italian football player and manager
Ferruccio Novo (1897–1974), Italian football (soccer) player, coach and club president
Ferruccio Pagni (1866–1935), French-Italian painter
Ferruccio Parri (1890–1981), Italian politician
Ferruccio Pasqui (1886–1958), Italian painter
Ferruccio Pisoni (1936–2020), Italian politician
Ferruccio Ranza (1892–1973), Italian military officer 
Ferruccio Rontini (1893–1964), Italian painter
Ferruccio Tagliavini (1913–1995), Italian tenor
Ferruccio Dalla Torre (1931–1987), Italian bobsledder 
Ferruccio Valcareggi (1919–2005), Italian football player and coach
Ferruccio Valobra (1898–1944), Italian politician
Ferruccio Vitale (1875–1933), Italian architect
Ferruccio Zambonini (1880–1932), Italian mineralogist and geologist

Middle name
Giuseppe Ferruccio Saro (born 1951), Italian politician

Surname
Francesco Ferruccio (1489–1530), Florentine captain

See also
Ferrucci

Italian masculine given names
Surnames of Italian origin